R. Michael Hendrix is an American graphic designer and entrepreneur.

He is a Partner and the Global Design Director of IDEO, based in the Cambridge, MA studio where he practices brand strategy, creative direction, and graphic design. He cites a diagram by Charles Eames as a motivation for joining IDEO. He has been a recognized advocate and practitioner of design thinking since co-founding Tricycle Inc., a sustainable design firm in 2002, which was purchased by Shaw Industries in 2017. In 2021 he co-authored, Two Beats Ahead: What Musical Minds Teach Us About Innovation, with Panos Panay, published by Public Affairs in the US and Penguin Business in the UK.

Hendrix teaches  entrepreneurship at the Berklee College of Music where is also a co-founder of the Open Music Initiative, a program of the Berklee Institute for Creative Entrepreneurship.

He graduated from The University of Tennessee in 1994 with a Bachelor of Fine Arts in Graphic Design.

Quotes 
In a 2008 Interview with GDUSA Hendrix said, "Designers have a chance to make significant contributions as we face mounting challenges like global warming, culture wars and shifting world powers. The challenge is to understand systems of influence and to create strategies to address them at connection points. We need to be aware that the design thinking skills used in our craft are also applicable to business and social concerns."

On starting an environmentally friendly carpet sample company he said, "“One of my primary reasons for cofounding Tricycle was the search for a career with greater meaning and social significance,” Hendrix adds. After several years as a practicing designer, he was ready for a change. “I began to believe it was possible to change the way design works, to benefit the designer, client, and larger society.”

In a 2015 interview with HOW magazine he commented on the changing nature of design: "I remember 20 years ago, when designers said, “We want a seat at the board table.” Guess what? We have it. The CEO doesn't want a poster or a nice brochure. That's where we were 20 years ago. That's created a whole new need for reeducating designers and a need for us to work differently. Every designer still has to utilize the craft that they studied and worked hard to develop. But if you're just a producer, you can only add one element to a solution — and you either have to find more people to add those extra elements that are needed, or you have to broaden your skillset. You either have a confederation of experts from different fields working together and reliant upon each other to produce a whole.... Or, on a smaller scale, individual designers have to be more of a generalist with a couple of depths. Like, you could be a graphic designer and a coder. That might serve you, depending on your industry. But what can't exist anymore is being a deep practitioner in a single craft and making a sustained living at it."

On entrepreneurship, he said, "When you're looking for a new opportunity, often you're looking for what's not there, not what does exist."

Recognitions 
While at Tricycle Inc. he was made an AIGA Fellow for significant contributions to the field of graphic design; received the Industrial Designers Society of America IDEA award for the carpet simulations; was selected for the Smithsonian Cooper-Hewitt National Design Triennial; and was a Top Nominee (now referred to as Finalist) for the Danish INDEX Awards  for Tricycle's sampling program.

He has also been recognized for design excellence by "American design associations and publications including the One Show, Type Directors Club, Print, HOW and Communication Arts" and is a regular speaker at design conferences including WIRED, SXSW, HOW Design, AIGA, and Design Management Institute.

Publications 
In 2010 he co-authored an article with Jane Fulton Suri for Rotman School of Management on why design thinking should also be accompanied by design sensibilities. In 2021 he co-authored, Two Beats Ahead: What Musical Minds Teach Us About Innovation, with Panos Panay, published by Public Affairs in the US and Penguin Business in the UK.

Other activities 
Hendrix writes and performs music as R.M. Hendrix. He released one album and two eps in 2011 with minor press coverage. Indie Machine described his music as "new wave with a side order of shoegaze". In 2014 he released "Urban Turks Country Jerks" on Moon Sounds Records, named one of the "fifty finest artists" of the year by Drowned in Sound. He released "Can It Find Us Here?" in 2017, "a startling record rooted in fears, paranoia, and cultural shock, an agit-pop reflection of the insane modern times he's sought to avoid," according to Vanyaland, a Boston-based music publication.

References

External links 
 Michael Hendrix on "Why Metaphors Make Us Fall in Love with Design" at WIRED by Design 2014
 Sustainable packaging interview on the DIELINE from August 2014
 IDEO brand identity interview with Fast Company
 
 
 
 Transcript of Sustainable Sampling Interview at Cooper Hewitt National Design Museum, 2007 
 

American graphic designers
Living people
Year of birth missing (living people)